Robert Massey is an American football player.

Robert Massey may also refer to:

Robert Massey (MP) for Flintshire (UK Parliament constituency), Flint Boroughs and Scarborough
Bob Massey, of Tsunami (band) and The Out Circuit

See also
Robert Massie (disambiguation)